Lazy pod Makytou is a village and municipality in the Púchov District of the Trenčín Region of north-western Slovakia.

History
In historical records the village was first mentioned in 1475.

Geography
The municipality lies at an altitude of 400 metres and covers an area of 49.905 km2. It has a population of about 1400 people.

References

External links
 
 
https://web.archive.org/web/20080111223415/http://www.statistics.sk/mosmis/eng/run.html

Tourism and living information 
 Official travel map
 Information for tourists visiting Lazy pod Makytou

Villages and municipalities in Púchov District